Hasan-Ali Khan Daghestani (d. 1721) was a Safavid official of Lezgian origin, who served as the governor (beglarbeg) of Shirvan (1718) and of Shamakhi (hakem; March 1720–1721). He was a nephew of the Safavid grand vizier Fath-Ali Khan Daghestani (1716-1720). 

During his tenure in Shirvan, the Lezgins of the Safavid domains in southern Dagestan and eastern Georgia (of the Qaniq valley) rose in revolt, ravaging Shirvan and completely defeating Hasan-Ali Khan's forces at Shaki. During his tenure in Shamakhi, he set out with a large Safavid force to defend against another Lezgin incursion, but the latter fell upon them at dawn; in the districts of Shaki, Hasan-Ali Khan Daghestani and a large number of his forces were killed.

References

Sources
  
  
 
 

17th-century births
1721 deaths
Iranian people of Lezgian descent
Safavid governors
Shamakhi District
Safavid governors of Shirvan
Safavid generals
17th-century people of Safavid Iran
18th-century people of Safavid Iran